Immaterial is a collection of horror stories by Australian horror writer Robert Hood. Immaterial collects fifteen tales featuring ghosts and grue in plenty, aptly demonstrating his range of concerns and effects.

Background
In 2001 Bill Congreve approached Hood with the idea of putting together a retrospective-style collection of his works. Immaterial was published in May 2002 by Congreve's publishing company MirrorDanse Books.

Contents
"An Apocalyptic Horse" – a bleak post-endtimes tale. 
"Number 7" – a holidaying couple encounter the legend that a double and not Rudolf Hess himself died in Spandau prison; there is the suggestion that Hess stole some of the Führer’s demonic science. 
"Peripheral Movement in the Leaves Under an Orange Tree" – is a finely judged tale of haunted leaf litter and skewed perception; 
"Resonance of the Flesh" – concerns a ritual based on the protagonist’s theory of morphic resonance and magic, the idea that there is a hidden continuum of reality (which he dubs the ‘neomorphuum’). 
"Housewarming" (with Paul Collins) – one of the weaker tales in the collection, concerns the revenge of a house upon a group of seven teenagers who burned it down, killing old Edith Withers and her two children. 
"Rough Trade" – the gargoyle made by sculptor Max Rusch twenty years ago now seeks to take on humanity; the outcome of their Frankenstein-like relationship is affecting. 
"Grandma and the Girls" – is a tensely macabre story of a domineering grandmother who haunts her family and is haunted by them. *"Dead in the Glamour of Moonlight”, one of Hood’s best tales, features a revenant of the murdered Nicole haunting her killer, Virgil; it is simultaneously a crime/zombie story. 
"Maculate Conception" – in which a man suffering separation from his wife seeks to obliterate a stain on his wall which ultimately proves the result of his own suicide, is rich with Hood’s deep feeling for the protagonist’s situation. 
"A Place for the Dead" – is equally grim, dark, and unrelenting in its concept of the New Dead (corpses who will not stay dead) and its dealing with child sexual abuse. 
"Dem Bones" – supernatural revenge
"Occasional Demons" – a dead princess haunts the young Republic of future Australia
"Nasty Little Habits" – a mother is tormented by her son’s ghost
"The Calling" – evokes a cosmic being in the best spirit of Algernon Blackwood.

References

2002 short story collections
Australian short story collections
Horror short story collections